Alicia Smith (born 27 September 1996) is a professional Australian tennis player.

She has career-high WTA rankings of 662 in singles, achieved on 10 August 2020, and 394 in doubles, achieved on 9 March 2020.

Smith made her Grand Slam main-draw debut after winning the 2016 Australian Open Women's Doubles Wildcard Playoff, granting her a wild card into the 2017 Australian Open women's doubles event.

In 2021, Smith won her debut ITF singles title at a $15k event in Solarino, Italy.

ITF finals

Singles: 1 (1 title)

Doubles: 6 (2 titles, 4 runner–ups)

External links
 
 
 

1996 births
Living people
Australian female tennis players
Tennis players from Brisbane
People from Tamworth, New South Wales
Tennis people from New South Wales
21st-century Australian women